The Rutgers School of Business in Camden teaches accounting, management, organizational behavior, marketing, and related arts of the business world in Camden, New Jersey, United States, not too far from Adventure Aquarium, the River Line and the Benjamin Franklin Bridge.

See also
List of United States business school rankings
List of business schools in the United States
Lists of business schools
Rutgers Business School – Newark and New Brunswick
Rutgers University
Rutgers–Camden

Business schools in New Jersey
Rutgers Business Z
Bus
Educational institutions established in 1988
1988 establishments in New Jersey